The 10th Parliament of Solomon Islands, determined by the 2014 general election, is the National Parliament of Solomon Islands from 2014 until 2019.  It was preceded by the ninth and followed by the eleventh.

The 10th Parliament consists of 50 representatives, elected from 50 single-seat constituencies.

References

Government of the Solomon Islands
Parliaments by country
National Parliament of the Solomon Islands